Huilai County (postal: Hweilai) is a county covering part of the eastern coast of Guangdong province, China, facing the South China Sea to the south. It lies under the jurisdiction of Jieyang.

Climate

Transportation
The currently under construction Huilai railway station, on the Shantou–Shanwei high-speed railway, will serve the county.

References

County-level divisions of Guangdong
Jieyang